Stewart Allen Resnick (born December 24, 1936) is an American billionaire businessman. In 2018, Resnick was the wealthiest farmer in the United States. Resnick and his wife, Lynda Resnick, bought The Franklin Mint in 1986 and sold it in 2006. Since 1979 Resnick has been the chairman and president of The Wonderful Company. He is married to Lynda Resnick, and through their holding company they own the POM Wonderful and Fiji Water brands, Wonderful Pistachios and Almonds, Wonderful Halos, JUSTIN Wines, Landmark Wines, JNSQ Wines and the Teleflora floral wire service company.

Early life and education
Resnick was born in 1936, and raised in a middle-class Jewish family in New Jersey and later moved to California with his family in the 1950s. His grandfather had immigrated from Ukraine when his father was 3.  In 1959, he graduated with a BS from the University of California, Los Angeles and then a JD from the UCLA School of Law. While in law school, he founded his first business, a janitorial services company, which he sold in 1969.

Career and companies
With the money he made from his first company, Resnick bought The Franklin Mint, a subsidiary of Roll International Corporation, in 1986. Franklin Mint is known for making model cars, souvenir plates, figurines, and Civil War-inspired chess sets. Resnick served as CEO and chairman of the Franklin Mint Company until its sale in 2006. Since 1979 Resnick has served as President and chairman of The Wonderful Company, formerly known as Roll Global, which owns many businesses in Central California and beyond. Through this holding company he and his wife own the POM Wonderful and Fiji Water brands, Wonderful Halos, Wonderful Pistachios and Almonds, JUSTIN Wines, Landmark Wines, JNSQ Wines, Suterra Pest Control and the Teleflora floral wire service company. Resnick sat on the board of directors of LeapFrog Enterprises from 2002 to 2005.

The Franklin Mint 

The Resnicks purchased The Franklin Mint in 1986 and expanded the company's collectibles business through new licensing agreements. These including the Louvre art museum in Paris, the Vatican, board games like Monopoly and Scrabble, classic cars, and famous people like John Wayne, Elvis Presley, and Marilyn Monroe.  The Resnicks sold  The Franklin Mint in 2006.

POM Wonderful 

In 2002 the Resnicks founded Pom Wonderful. The company's main product is pomegranate juice, which is sold in a trademark "double-bulb" bottle with the product name, POM, featured in capital letters where the O is substituted by a heart symbol. The company also manufactures blended juice beverages, such as pomegranate juice mixed with juices of blueberry, cranberry, cherry, mango or tangerine, and bottled tea- and coffee-based beverages of various flavors distributed in more conventional containers. In addition to drinks, the company sells pills and concentrated liquid products marketed as nutritional supplements. In 2017, POM Wonderful acquired the pomegranate distributor Ruby Fresh.

Fiji Water 

The Resnicks acquired the Fiji Water business in 2004, increasing sales of Fiji Water by 300% in 4 years, making it the largest imported bottled water brand in the US. It comes from the aquifer on the island of Viti Levu, and can be found in luxury hotels, leading restaurants and airports around the world. Through the Fiji Water Foundation the company provides clean water access to rural communities, builds educational facilities and infrastructure that benefit communities and provides access to health care services.

Wonderful Halos 
In 2013 the Resnicks launched Wonderful Halos mandarins, with a $220 million facility in the San Joaquin Valley capable of processing 19 million mandarins a day. By 2017 Halos was the #1 segment brand, forecast to have around 70-80% market share by 2018. In 2017, Halos accounted for around three-quarters of growth in the mandarin category, and 12% of total produce sales growth.

Wonderful Pistachios and Almonds 
Wonderful Pistachios & Almonds is the world's largest vertically integrated pistachio and almond grower and processor, cultivating and harvesting more than 65,000 acres of pistachio and almond orchards and delivering more than 450 million pounds of nuts globally each year. Known for its Get Crackin''' campaign, Wonderful Pistachios was the US's fastest-growing snack brand and the number 1 tree nut brand in 2018.  

 JUSTIN Wines 
In 2010 the Resnicks purchased Justin Vineyards and Winery, a 50,000 case-production winery in California's Central Coast region founded in 1981. JUSTIN Wines specializes in Bordeaux style varieties, such as Cabernet Sauvignon, Merlot and Cabernet Franc, and was named the 2015 American Winery of the Year by Wine Enthusiast Magazine.

Philanthropy
Resnick is a Trustee Emeritus of the J. Paul Getty Trust and is on the Board of Visitors of the UCLA Anderson School of Management. He sits on the board of trustees of Bard College and Conservation International. He also serves on the Board of Advisers at UC Davis, the Lowell Milken Institute for Business Law & Policy at UCLA, and is a Caltech Senior Trustee.

In 2005 the Resnick Neuropsychiatric Hospital was named for Resnick and his wife in honor of their involvement. They made a $4 million donation to Children's Hospital Central California in 2006. At Caltech's 2009 graduation ceremonies, Caltech announced that the Resnicks had donated $20 million towards a "sustainability center" to be named after themselves.

In September 2008, Resnick and his wife announced a $45 million gift to the Los Angeles County Museum of Art for the construction of a new exhibition pavilion, as well as $10 million in artworks. In 2018, the Hammer Museum in Los Angeles announced the couple's $30 million gift to help pay for a renovation and expansion project.

In September 2019, Resnick and his wife pledged their largest donation to date, a $750 million endowment to Caltech for climate research.

In October 2022, the Resnicks pledged $50 million to the University of California, Davis for sustainbility research and the establishment of the Lynda and Stewart Resnick Center for Agricultural Innovation.

Personal life
He is divorced from his first wife, Sandra Frazier. Since 1973, he has been married to Lynda Rae Harris. He has three children from his first marriage: Jeff Resnick, Ilene Resnick, and Bill Resnick; and two stepchildren from his marriage to Harris: Jason Sinay and Jonathan Sinay. They reside in Beverly Hills, California.

Criticism
Growing water-intensive nut tree crops in the Central Valley—a single almond requires  of water—has drawn criticism during California's ongoing drought. According to Forbes Magazine Wonderful Company uses "at least 120 billion gallons [450 million m3] a year, two-thirds on nuts, enough to supply San Francisco's 852,000 residents for a decade." In addition the Resnicks own a majority stake in the Kern Water Bank, "one of California's largest underground water storage facilities. It is capable of storing 500 billion gallons [1.9 billion m3] of water. The acquisition, continuing private ownership, and water sales profit from this taxpayer-developed resource infrastructure while California suffers under drought is controversial.

In an effort to make their impact on the region more positive, the Resnicks have invested in the growth of the local economy and nutrition centers. As the New York Times notes, "in Lost Hills there are new health centers, new pre-K facilities, new housing projects, new gardens, new sidewalks and lights, a new community center and a new soccer field." They have partnered with the Central Valley Project and the State Water Project to bring water to Kern County spending $35 million in recent years buying up more water from nearby districts to replenish the Central Valley's supplies.

At the same time as exporting almonds to Asia and other locations, they import Fiji bottled water from the South Pacific. Some foreign conservationists criticize the Resnicks for "hogging the archipelago's precious water supply... while island natives didn't always have water to drink themselves, due to crumbling and insufficient infrastructure." However, local officials support the investment Fiji water makes in the economy as "a critical contributor to the Fijian Economy... and a gift to the Fijian tourism industry."

In addition, their claims for the "POM" pomegranate drink have been contested.  Forbes'' reported,  "The Federal Trade Commission filed a complaint in 2010 that the Resnicks' POM Wonderful had used deceptive advertising when marketing the antioxidant-rich drink as being able to treat, prevent or reduce the risk of heart disease, prostate cancer and erectile dysfunction. In 2012 a federal judge agreed that some of the ads were misleading. In 2013 FTC commissioners denied the Resnicks' appeal. In October of 2015, the Resnicks asked the Supreme Court to take the case."  In May 2016 the Supreme Court declined.

In 2015 it was revealed that the Resnicks and other farmers had been watering their orchards with treated fracking waste water. A water recycling program in California allows oil companies to sell wastewater to landowners, including farmers like the Wonderful Company.

References

American business executives
American company founders
Businesspeople from Los Angeles
The Wonderful Company
1938 births
Living people
American billionaires
Philanthropists from California
Jewish American philanthropists
People associated with the Los Angeles County Museum of Art
People from Beverly Hills, California
People from New Jersey
Bard College
University of California, Los Angeles alumni
UCLA School of Law alumni
20th-century American businesspeople
21st-century American businesspeople
American people of Ukrainian-Jewish descent
21st-century American Jews